Hotel Anglo-Hispano is a building in Algeciras, Spain. It was originally used as a hotel and is now used as an office space.

History
This building operated as a hotel from the late nineteenth century to the 1980s. It was the scene of several major events in the history of Algeciras. In 1906, along with the nearby Hotel Reina Cristina, it served much of the delegations attending the Conference of Algeciras. It underwent extensive restoration between 2007 and 2010 and is built in the eclectic style.

Architecture
The building style has three floors organized around a central courtyard, through which the rooms can be accessed by stairs. One aspect of the façade on the ground floor are doors and window lintels with small decorative elements that correspond to the old hall. The rooms on the second and third floors have windows free of decoration and instead have balconies in colonial style. The terrace of the building repeats an element present in the city with a metal handrail attached by several piles of masonry. The left side of the building is accessible to the Coral Courtyard, a set of homes built on the ancient gate of the medina Arabian Sea. By the sea, in the same street is the building of the Kursaal. This is a modern construction by Guillermo Pérez Villalta, and it is an exhibition hall today.

Restoration

In 2007, the municipality of Algeciras made a specific amendment to the General Urban Plan (General Plan) in order to change the uses allowed for a building occupying this building plot. The purpose of this change was, given the high costs of restoration of the building, was to allow the purchase of the building by a private company that would take over the work. Thus the management of the Hotel Anglo-Hispanic went from a plot for public use to private use. This made possible the restoration of the building in 2008 and its transformation into an office building occupied by a law firms called Anglo-Hispanic. The recovery of the building was accompanied by development of the mouth of the river with the construction of an urban park called Paseo del Rio de la Miel. This opened in 2010 and helped the value of the building and adjacent areas.

References

Hotels in Algeciras